Jorge Fondebrider (Buenos Aires, 1956) is an Argentinian poet, critic and translator.

His published poetry books are Elegías (1983), Imperio de la Luna (1987), Standards (1993), Los últimos tres años (2006) and La extraña trayectoria de la luz. Poemas reunidos 1983-2013 (2016). Also he was translated into English (The Spaces Between, an anthology translated by Richard Gwyn - Meirion House, Glan yr afon, Wales, U.K., Cinnamon Press, 2013) and into Swedish (De Tre Senaste Aren, translated by Martin Uggla -
Malmö, Sweden, Siesta Förlag, 2015).

He also published La Buenos Aires ajena (2000), a history of the city told by foreigners that visited it since 1536 to 2000; Versiones de la Patagonia (2003), a history of that part of Argentina, told by confronting different versions of the same facts, Licantropía. Historias de hombres lobos de Occidente (2004 and 2015, and under the new title  Historias de los hombres lobos, 2015, 2016 and 2017), a history of werewolfism in the Western world through the ages until the present; La París de los argentinos (2010), a history of Argentinian emigration to France as well as a history of France told by Argentinian witnesses, and Dublín (2019), a history and travelog of that city.

He has edited four anthologies of Argentinian poetry and a number of critical essays on poetry and cultural matters. Among them,  (1995),  (2006), . 1970-2008 (2008), Giannuzzi. Reseñas, artículos y trabajos académicos sobre su obra (2010),  1910-2010 (2010), Poésie récente d'Argentine. Une anthologie possible (2013), Cómo se ordena una biblioteca (2014), Cómo se empieza a narrar (2015) Poetas que traducen poesía (2015) and the collected works of César Fernández Moreno (1999) and Joaquín O. Giannuzzi (2009).

He also translated many books of contemporary French poetry –Guillaume Apollinaire, Henri Deluy and Yves Di Manno, among others–, the huge anthology Poesía francesa contemporánea. 1940-1997, three volumes by Georges Perec, one by Canadian author Lori Saint-Martin, and an annotated versions of Madame Bovary and Three Tales by Gustave Flaubert and "Heart of Darkness" by Joseph Conrad, as well as Welsh and Scottish authors (among them Richard Gwyn, Patrick McGuinness, and Owen Martell, and Tom Pow, respectively) and some Americans (Jack London, Patricia Highsmith). He is an active promoter of Irish culture in Latin America and introduced to a wide Spanish speaking audience authors as Anthony Cronin (Dead as Doornails),  Claire Keegan (Antarctica, Walk the Blue Fields and Foster), Joseph O’Connor (Ghost Light) and Moya Cannon (an anthology of her poetry).
Together with Gerardo Gambolini, he choose and translated the texts from  Poesía irlandesa contemporánea (1999), the first bilingual anthology of contemporary Irish poetry published in a Spanish speaking country; also, a book on the Ulster cycle, a collection of Irish traditional short stories, a book on Anglo-Scottish ballads and Peter Street & otros poemas (2008), by the Irish poet Peter Sirr.

In 2009 he co-founded with Julia Benseñor the Club de Traductores Literarios de Buenos Aires (http://clubdetraductoresliterariosdebaires.blogspot.com/).

References

https://www.eternacadencia.com.ar/blog/libreria/lecturas/item/tres-poemas-de-jorge-fondebrider.html

1956 births
Living people
Writers from Buenos Aires
Argentine male poets
Argentine translators
Argentine people of German descent
English–Spanish translators
French–Spanish translators